The 2021 National Hurling League was the 90th season of the National Hurling League for county teams. The English county teams (London, Warwickshire and Lancashire) did not compete due to the COVID-19 pandemic travel restrictions.

In February 2021 it was announced that the league would be delayed due to the impact of the COVID-19 pandemic on Gaelic games and that cancelling it would be a last resort. The league began on 8 May 2021.

Eir Sport and RTÉ provided live TV coverage of the league on Saturday nights. TG4 broadcast Sunday afternoon games. The highlights programmes were RTÉ2's League Sunday on Sunday evenings, and TG4's GAA 2021 on Monday evenings.

Format

League structure

Thirty-two teams competed in the 2021 National Hurling League –
 twelve teams organised in two six-team groups of approximately equal strength in Division 1
 six teams in Division 2A
 five teams in Divisions 2B and 3A
 four teams in Division 3B.
All thirty-two county teams from Ireland took part.

London, Lancashire and Warwickshire did not take part; they retained their division placings (2B, 3A and 3B respectively) for the 2022 National Hurling League.

Each team plays all the other teams in their division once, either home or away. Two points are awarded for a win, and one for a draw.

Tie-breaker
 If only two teams are level on league points, the team that won the head-to-head match is ranked ahead. If this game was a draw, score difference (total scored minus total conceded in all games) is used to rank the teams.
 If three or more teams are level on league points, score difference is used to rank the teams.

Final, promotions and relegations

Division 1
There is no final; there will either be joint winners, or if the teams that win Divisions 1A and 1B meet in the 2021 All-Ireland Senior Hurling Championship, this will double as the NHL final.
 The bottom team in each group meet in a relegation play-off, with the losers being relegated to Division 2A
Divisions 2A, 2B and 3A
 The first-placed team is the division champion and is promoted 
 The bottom team is relegated 
Division 3B
 The first-placed team is the Division 3B champion and is promoted to Division 3A

Division 1

Division 1 Format

The top twelve teams compete in Division 1 in two six-team groups of approximately equal strength. This group structure was introduced in 2020.

Each team play all the other teams in their group once. Two points are awarded for a win and one for a draw. The top team in each group will be deemed "Co-champion", unless they are drawn together in the 2021 All-Ireland Senior Hurling Championship, in which case the match will double up as the league final.

Division 1 Group A Table

Division 1 Group A Rounds 1 to 5

Division 1 Group A Round 1

Division 1 Group A Round 2

Division 1 Group A Round 3

Division 1 Group A Round 4

Division 1 Group A Round 5

Division 1 Group B Table

Division 1 Group B Rounds 1 to 5

Division 1 Group B Round 1

Division 1 Group B Round 2

Division 1 Group B Round 3

Division 1 Group B Round 4

Division 1 Group B Round 5

Division 1 Final

If the two teams that won Divisions 1A and 1B (Galway and Kilkenny respectively) had met in the 2021 All-Ireland Senior Hurling Championship, this would have doubled as the league final. This did not happen so both teams were declared as joint winners.

Division 1 relegation play-off

The bottom teams in the two Division 1 groups met in a play-off with the losers (Westmeath) relegated to Division 2A.

Division 1 scoring statistics

Top scorers overall

Top scorers in a single game

Division 2A

Division 2A Table

Division 2A Rounds 1 to 5

Division 2A Round 1

Division 2A Round 2

Division 2A Round 3

Division 2A Round 4

Division 2A Round 5

Division 2A scoring statistics

Top scorers overall

Top scorers in a single game

Division 2B

Division 2B Table

Division 2B Rounds 1 to 5

Division 2B Round 1

Division 2B Round 2

Division 2B Round 3

Division 2B Round 4

Division 2B Round 5

Division 2B scoring statistics

Top scorers overall

Top scorers in a single game

Division 3A

Division 3A Table

Division 3A Rounds 1 to 5

Division 3A Round 1

Division 3A Round 2

Division 3A Round 3

Division 3A Round 4

Division 3A Round 5

Division 3B

Division 3B Table

Division 3B Rounds 1 to 3

Division 3B Round 1

Division 3B Round 2

Division 3B Round 3

References

External links
Full Fixtures and Results

 
National League
National Hurling League seasons